The Desert League of Professional Baseball is an independent baseball league that began in 2016. Unlike other independent leagues, it features a winter schedule playing games from September through November.

History 
Formed with a focus for rookie or first year professional players, the Desert League signed over 100 players to their first professional contracts and completed its inaugural season in 2016. The Desert League was designed as an independent professional league for rookies, and required each team carry a minimum of 12 rookies on their roster. The league had four teams based in California and Arizona. Somerton Cañeros were an affiliate of the Mexican Pacific League club Cañeros de Los Mochis. Some games were played in San Luis, Mexico.

Yuma Maple Leafs were crowned the first league champion on October 28, 2016 sweeping the best-of three championship series with the Imperial County Ghost Riders. After winning Game 1 the previous night in walk-off fashion 4-3 the Maple Leafs took the second game 8-2.

Before the start of the second season the league announced that an agreement had been reached with the California Winter League and the league would suspend operations. Financial terms of the agreement were not disclosed.

On December 20, 2019, league president Luke Powell announced the Desert League would resume play in September of 2021. However operations were suspended again in March 2020 due to the COVID-19 pandemic.

On May 2, 2021, the Desert League announced it would resume operations and play in Fall 2023.

Teams

Champions

See also
Baseball awards #U.S. independent professional leagues

References

External links 
 Desert League Facebook
Desert League Twitter

Winter baseball leagues
Independent baseball leagues in the United States
Sports leagues established in 2016
2016 establishments in Arizona
2016 establishments in California
Baseball leagues in Arizona
Baseball leagues in California